The Bochum Stadtbahn is a light rail line in North Rhine-Westphalia, Germany, linking the cities of Bochum and Herne. It is operated by BOGESTRA, and is integrated into the Rhine-Ruhr Stadtbahn network. It consists of a single Stadtbahn line, which includes a tunnel section between the city centers of Bochum and Herne.

History
The Bochum Stadtbahn opened on 2 September 1989, then operating a route between Castle Herne Strünkede and Bochum Central Station. An extension of the line from the Bochum Central Station south to the Ruhr-University Bochum and to Hustadt opened for service on 28 November 1993. Planned sections of the Bochum Stadtbahn northwest to Recklinghausen and southeast to Witten were never implemented due to the associated costs to these respective municipalities.

Route and operations

The Bochum Stadtbahn route is called the U35 line. More than two-thirds of this line runs underground. Only the southernmost six stations are at grade, in the portion of the U35 line that runs in the median of a highway. On this section, there are three at-grade road crossings, which renders it not a true metro system but a light rail one. The U35 is by far the busiest public transport line in the BOGESTRA service area – it is the only rail line to run every 5 minutes on weekdays and the only one on which the trains consist of two coupled-car trainsets.

The other Stadtbahn lines that were planned for the Bochum Stadtbahn system were never finished, but portions of those planned lines were built and are in use by transit. In Bochum, two more tunnels were built under the city center, one east-west tunnel and one northeast-southwest tunnel. Both of these have four underground stations. In Gelsenkirchen, a tunnel was built as well – it begins at the train station and from there heads north, via the city center.

Rolling stock 
The U35 line uses 25 standardized Stadtbahnwagen B trainsets from Duewag supplemented with 6 Stadler Tango trainsets. These all have a high-floor design and operate independently from the low-floor NF6D and Variobahn used by the on-street tram network.

See also
 Trams in Bochum/Gelsenkirchen
 Rhine-Ruhr Stadtbahn
 Verkehrsverbund Rhein-Ruhr

References

Inline references

Further reading

External links 

 BOGESTRA Homepage 
 Track plan of the Bochum/Gelsenkirchen tram system, including the Stadtbahn

Bochum
Light rail in Germany
Tram transport in Germany
Underground rapid transit in Germany